The West Indies cricket team toured England in the 1957 season to play a five-match Test series against England.

England won the series 3-0 with two matches drawn. West Indies' spinners Sonny Ramadhin and Alf Valentine were unable to repeat the success they had on the 1950 tour, and though the young Wes Hall was in the team, the fast bowling was not yet as potent as it would be in a few years, and Hall did not play in the Tests.

West Indies side
The West Indies team was captained by John Goddard, who had led the successful 1950 team. The vice-captain was Clyde Walcott but towards the end of the tour, when both Goddard and Walcott were injured, the team was captained in some matches by Frank Worrell who "showed unmistaken gifts of leadership", according to Wisden Cricketers' Almanack.

The full side was:
 John Goddard, captain
 Clyde Walcott, vice-captain
 Gerry Alexander, wicketkeeper
 Nyron Asgarali
 Denis Atkinson
 Tom Dewdney
 Andy Ganteaume
 Roy Gilchrist
 Wes Hall
 Rohan Kanhai
 Bruce Pairaudeau
 Sonny Ramadhin
 Collie Smith
 Gary Sobers
 Alf Valentine
 Everton Weekes
 Frank Worrell

Kanhai was used as the reserve wicketkeeper and, because his batting was deemed stronger than Alexander's, was used as the wicketkeeper in the first three Test matches, though Wisden said that he was "little more than a stopper". Ganteaume, a wicketkeeper during his early career with Trinidad, did not keep wicket on the tour.

Alexander, Asgarali, Gilchrist, Hall and Kanhai had not played Test cricket before this tour; all except Hall made their Test debuts during the series. Of the other players who had played Test cricket before 1957, only Ganteaume did not make an appearance during the Test series.

Test series summary

First Test

Second Test

Third Test

Fourth Test

Fifth Test

External sources
 CricketArchive – tour summaries

Annual reviews
 Playfair Cricket Annual 1958
 Wisden Cricketers' Almanack 1958

1957 in West Indian cricket
1957 in English cricket
1957
International cricket competitions from 1945–46 to 1960